
Manby is a village and civil parish in the East Lindsey district of Lincolnshire, England, and lies approximately  east from Louth.
Manby contains a village post office. Other amenities, including a primary school, The Manby Arms public house, two village shops, and an Italian restaurant, are in the conjoined village of Grimoldby, separated from Manby by the B1200 road. It is also the administrative centre of the East Lindsey District. The population was 1,655 at the 2021 census.

Manby scout group, the 1st Manby, has existed for 60 years. It is one of only two scout groups in the area to include all scouting sections: Beavers, aged 6–8; Cubs, aged 8–10; Scouts, aged 11½–14; and Explorers, aged 14–18. The other is the 6th Skegness.

RAF Manby 

RAF Manby was situated near the village between 1938 and 1974.  Houses in Manby were built for RAF personnel, with village streets named after aeroplanes. In the late 1980s the entire pre war Married Quarter estate Carlton Park was sold to a Roger Byron-Collins company.

The airfield sold for commercial use. It is now a business park, and the former airfield has been returned to agriculture with an intensive cattle fattening plant. The headquarters of East Lindsey District Council occupies one of the buildings on the site, and Regents Academy also were based at the park until 2017.

In 2008 East Lindsey District Council proposed that the site be a possible location for an eco-town of 5,000 homes; it appeared on a government shortlist of ten such sites. After protests from residents the council voted to withdraw the plan.

Climate

References

External links

Detailed historic record about Manby Airfield
Information on the disused RAF Manby air traffic control tower

Villages in Lincolnshire
Civil parishes in Lincolnshire
East Lindsey District